The 2000–01 Eliteserien season was the 62nd season of ice hockey in Norway. Ten teams participated in the league, and Valerenga Ishockey won the championship.

Regular season

Playoffs

External links
Season on hockeyarchives.info

GET-ligaen seasons
Norway
GET